Jaunpur is a city and a municipal board in Jaunpur district in the Indian state of Uttar Pradesh. It is located 228 km southeast of state capital Lucknow. Demographically, Jaunpur resembles the rest of the Purvanchal area in which it is located.

History

Earlier the Jaunpur district was ruled by the Bhar, historically known as Sultan, having its historical dates from 1359, when the city was founded by the Sultan of Delhi Feroz Shah Tughlaq and named in memory of his cousin, Muhammad bin Tughluq, whose given name was Jauna Khan. In 1388, Feroz Shah Tughlaq appointed Malik Sarwar, a eunuch, who is notorious for having been the lover of Feroz Shah Tughlaq's daughter, as the governor of the region. The Sultanate was in disarray because of factional fighting for power, and in 1393 Malik Sarwar declared independence. He and his adopted son Mubarak Shah founded what came to be known as the Sharqi dynasty (dynasty of the East). During the Sharqi period the Jaunpur Sultanate was a strong military power in Northern India, and on several occasions threatened the Delhi Sultanate. The Jaunpur Sultanate attained its greatest height under the younger brother of Mubarak Shah, who ruled as Shams-ud-din Ibrahim Shah (ruled 1402–1440). To the east, his kingdom extended to Bihar, and to the west, to Kanauj; he even marched on Delhi at one point. Under the aegis of a Muslim holy man named Qutb al-Alam, he threatened the Sultanate of Bengal under Shihabuddin Bayazid Shah.

During the reign of Husain Shah (1456–76), the Jaunpur army was perhaps the biggest in India, and Husain decided to attempt a conquest of Delhi. However, he was defeated on three successive attempts by Bahlul Khan Lodi. It is a dominant trend in modern historiography of the period that this defeat was a cause of a large number of eunuchs in the military ranks. Finally, under Sikandar Lodi, the Delhi Sultante was able to reconquer Jaunpur in 1493, bringing that sultanate to an end.

The Jaunpur Sultanate was a major center of Urdu and Sufi knowledge and culture. The Sharqi dynasty was known for its excellent communal relations between Muslims and Hindus, perhaps stemming from the fact that the Sharqis themselves were originally indigenous converts to Islam, as opposed to descendants of Persians or Afghans. Jaunpur's independence came to an end in 1480, when the city was conquered by Sikander Lodhi, the Sultan of Delhi. The Sharqi kings attempted for several years to retake the city, but ultimately failed.

Although many of the Sharqi monuments were destroyed when the Lodis took the city, several important mosques remain, most notably the Atala Masjid, Jama Masjid (now known as the Bari (big mosque) Masjid) and the Lal Darwaza Masjid. The Jaunpur mosques display a unique architectural style, combining traditional Hindu and Muslim motifs with purely original elements. The old bridge over the Gomti River in Jaunpur dates from 1564, the era of the Mughal Emperor Akbar. The bridge is still being used for transportation. The Jaunpur Qila, a fortress from the Tughlaq era, also remains in good form.

Jaunpur district was annexed into British India based on the Permanent settlement of 1779, and thus was subject to the Zamindari system of land revenue collection.

During the Revolt of 1857 the Sikh troops in Jaunpur joined the Indian rebels. The district was eventually reconquered for the British by Gurkha troops from Nepal. Jaunpur then became a district administrative center.

Present state
Jaunpur is the district headquarters. The district has 2 Lok Sabha and 9 Vidhan Sabha constituencies.

Geography

Rivers
Gomti, Sai, Varuna, Pili, Mayur and Basuhi are the five rivers which make its land fertile.

Demographics 
As per 2011 Indian Census, Jaunpur NPP had population of 180,362 of which male and female were 93,718 and 86,644 respectively, that is a sex ratio of 1024 females per 1000 males. Child population in the age range of 0–6 years was 22,710. The total number of literates in Jaunpur was 128,050, which constituted 71% of the population with male literacy of 75.2% and female literacy of 66.5%. The effective literacy rate of 7+ population of Jaunpur was 81.2%, of which male literacy rate was 86.1% and female literacy rate was 75.9%. The Scheduled Castes and Scheduled Tribes population was 12,703 and 195 respectively. There were 26216 households as of 2011.

Economy
GSG, GS Green Enterprise Katehari-Leduka Jaunpur was established in March 2017 by the Govt. of Uttar Pradesh, under U.P. Industrial Area Development Act, 1976 to facilitate concentrated effort on Industrial development of eastern Uttar Pradesh.

In its 1st phase of activity, the authority has a fully developed growth center area on 10 acres of land, under growth center scheme of Govt. of India. Hawkins Cookers Limited company has one of the three manufacturing plants in India at Jaunpur to manufacture pressure cookers and cookware.

Satharia Industrial Development Authority was established in November 1989 by the Govt. of Uttar Pradesh, under U.P. Industrial Area Development Act, 1976 to facilitate concentrated effort on Industrial development of eastern Uttar Pradesh.

Sidhwan-Rampur Industrial Development Authority has now setting its base in Rampur Nirvachan Kshetra on Jaunpur-Bhadohi Road in Mariyahu tehsil.

In its 1st phase of activity, the authority has a fully developed growth center area on 508 acres of land, under a growth center scheme of Govt. of India.

Virtually all kinds of industrial, commercial and social infrastructural facilities, such as medical, educational, residential, roads, transportation, drainage, telecommunication, dedicated industrial power 33/11 KV supply, post office, bank, water supply, community center, shopping center, and field hostel have been fully established and are operative.

Under One District, One Product (ODOP) Scheme 2018 of the UP Govt., perfume and carpet industry have been selected for Jaunpur district.

Landmarks

There are a number of tourist attractions in Jaunpur including monuments, and holy places.

Monuments
 Shahi Bridge
 Shahi Quila Jaunpur Fort

Religious sites
 Atala Masjid, Jaunpur
 Jama Masjid, Jaunpur
 Lal Darwaza Masjid, Jaunpur
 Sheetala Chaukia Dham Mandir Jaunpur

Transportation

Rail

Jaunpur is well-connected with all major cities of India thanks to Indian Railways. Zafarabad (ZBD) also a railway station where's many train routes are diverted i.e., Allahababd, Varanasi, Lucknow Via Sultanpur, Lucknow via Shahganj, Ghazipur via Jaunpur junction.

Road

Jaunpur is well-connected to Lucknow, Gorakhpur, Varanasi, Allahabad and other cities like Azamgarh, Mirzapur, Janghai, Sultanpur, Kerakat, Ghazipur etc. Mariahu NH-56, SH-36 are the roadways connecting all major cities to Jaunpur.Jaunpur to Babatpur NH-56 is now 4-lane highway. 

On 20 December 2021 Chief Minister of Uttar Pradesh Yogi Adityanath and Minister for Road Transport & Highways Nitin Gadkari announced new highways worth ₹1500 crore that are currently under construction. They are:

 Jaunpur-Mariyahu-Bhadohi (38KM) 
 Machlishahr-Janghai-Bhadohi (48KM)
 Janghai-Bhadohi Greenfield Bypass (36KM)

Air
An airport was planned to be built near Pali village of Mariyahu Tehsil in 2018 which was later cancelled.

Education

University

 Veer Bahadur Singh Purvanchal University, formerly Purvanchal University, is in Jaunpur. It was established in 1987 as a residential-cum-affiliating university and is named after Vir Bahadur Singh, former chief minister of Uttar Pradesh.
 Umanath Singh Autonomous State Medical Collage (UNS ASMC), in Siddiqpur has also been inaugurated by Prime Minister under One District One medical college during late 2021.

Notable institutes
 Jawahar Navodaya Vidyalaya, 21 km south from the district headquarters on Lumbini - Duddhi Road in Katghara Village near Mariahu Tehsil.
 Prasad Institute of Technology, affiliated to Dr. A.P.J. Abdul Kalam Technical University
 Tilak Dhari Singh Post Graduate Degree College, is in heart of the Sadar tehsil. It has stadium, parking and auditorium facilities as well.

Local media
Mostly all major English, Hindi and Urdu dailies including Times of India, Hindustan Times, The Hindu, Dainik Jagran, Amar Ujala, Hindustan, Rashtreey Sahara, Inquilab, Hausla News available in Jaunpur. Hindi and Urdu dailies also have their bureaus in the city. Almost all major Hindi TV news channel have stringers in the city. A Hindi newspaper Tarunmitra is also published from Jaunpur. The city also catches Radio FM waves from neighboring city Varanasi they are:

 RED FM 93.5
 Radio Mirchi 98.3
 Big FM 92.7
 Vividh Bharti 100.6

Notable people

 Jagmohan Yadav, Former DGP of Uttar Pradesh Police
 Hasan Abidi
 Sharadindu Bandyopadhyay
 Munna Bajrangi
 Banarasidas
 Ashok Bhushan
 Yadavendra Dutt Dubey
 Syed Wazir Hasan
 Majid Ali Jaunpuri  an Islamic scholar
 Muhammad Jaunpuri
 Ravi Kishan 
 Ashish Dixit
 Shailendra Yadav Lalai
 Mohammad Akram Nadwi an Islamic scholar
 Gaurav Yadav, DGP of Punjab Police
 Dinesh Kunwar Patel
 Sushma Patel
 Tribhuvan Ram
 Jawahar Yadav (Pandit)
 Dhananjay Singh
 Harivansh Singh
 Indu Prakash Singh
 Justice Surendra Kumar Yadav
 Lalji Singh
 Shakeel Ahmed Samdani
 Jagdish Sonkar
 Rajesh Vivek
 Girish Chandra Yadav

Reference

External links 

 
Cities and towns in Jaunpur district
Cities in Uttar Pradesh